Call It Whatever may refer to:
Call It Whatever (album)
"Call It Whatever" (song)